The Toughest is also the title of another Peter Tosh album, released by Heartbeat Records in 1996.

The Toughest is a compilation album by reggae artist Peter Tosh.

Track listing
"Coming In Hot"
"Don't Look Back"
"Pick Myself Up"
"Crystal Ball"
"Mystic man"
"Reggaemylitis"
"Bush Doctor"
"Maga Dog"
"Johnny B. Goode"
"Equal Rights" / "Downpresser Man"
"In My Song"

Peter Tosh albums
Albums produced by Chris Kimsey
1988 compilation albums